Jack Alexandar Binstead (born September 30, 1996) is an English actor, comedian, and retired athlete who starred as Rem Dogg in BBC Three's Bad Education. He is also known for his junior career as a British wheelchair athlete. Binstead was diagnosed with osteogenesis imperfecta and has been a wheelchair user since the age of three.

Filmography

Television

Film

References 

1996 births
Living people
21st-century English male actors
English male television actors
Place of birth missing (living people)
People with osteogenesis imperfecta